'First' is the debut EP of Singaporean singer, Ferlyn G. It consists of a total of three tracks and was released on January 2, 2015.

Background
In 2014, Ferlyn announced that she will be leaving Skarf and releasing a solo EP in 2015 before Chinese New Year. After a series of teasers, the EP was released on January 2, 2015, during a press conference at Bugis+ in Singapore. The music video for both Xīn fàng kāi (心放开) and Luv Talk was released through iGlobalStar's official YouTube channel on January 2, 2015.

Composition
Ferlyn worked with various well known composers and singers such as Gen Neo from Noizebank and Mint from Tiny-G. The promotional tracks, Luv Talk and Xīn fàng kāi (心放开) is a fun pop tune and is about having a crush while the second track, Bùjiàn bú sàn (不見不散) about the experience during a breakup.

Music video
The music video for the promotional track, Luv Talk and Xīn fàng kāi (心放开) begin on a deceptively melancholy note with a teary Ferlyn perched on a bridge and dramatic piano instrumental playing behind her, the song soon ramps up the atmosphere with a full brass tone and hip rhythm. The story flashes back to an unpleasant conversation Ferlyn has with an unknown man. However, after being down, she transforms herself into a new self with a change in make up and outfit.

Track list 
※ Bold track title means it is the title track in the album.

References

External links

2015 EPs
Chinese-language EPs
Korean-language EPs